The FIVB World Grand Prix 2005 was the thirteenth edition of the annual women's volleyball tournament, which is the female equivalent of the Men's Volleyball World League. The 2005 edition was played by twelve countries from June 24 to July 18, 2005, with the final round held at the Sendai Gymnasium in Sendai, Japan. Hosts Japan and the top five ranked teams after the preliminary rounds qualified for the last round.

The competition of the 2005 WGP lasted four weeks with a total number of 69 matches. During the first, second and third week: 18 matches per team were played with a total of 54 matches. Classification in the preliminary rounds was decided by the number of points gained by teams participating in the same group. The classification in the general ranking of the preliminary rounds of the 2005 WGP was decided by the total number of World Grand Prix Points (GPP) gained by the teams in the preliminary matches.

Qualification

Asia
The top four Asian teams according to the FIVB World Rankings

Europe
European Qualification Tournament in Ankara, Turkey, from September 21 to September 26, 2004.

|}
Romania replaced ;  received a wild card

|}

North and South America
Pan-American Cup in Mexicali and Tijuana, Mexico, from June 18 to June 26, 2004.

Teams

Preliminary rounds

Ranking
The host China and top five teams in the preliminary round advance to the Final round.

|}

First round

Group A
Venue: Tokyo, Japan

|}

Group B
Venue: Reggio Calabria, Italy

|}

Group C
Venue: Ningbo, China

|}

Second round

Group D
Venue: Seoul, South Korea

|}

Group E
Venue: Macau

|}

Group F
Venue: Manila, Philippines

|}

Third round

Group G
Venue: Hong Kong

|}

Group H
Venue: Taipei, Taiwan

|}

Group I
Venue: Bangkok, Thailand

|}

Final round
Venue: Sendai Gymnasium, Sendai, Japan

|}

Final ranking

|}

Overall ranking

Individual awards

Most Valuable Player:

Best Scorer:

Best Spiker:

Best Blocker:

Best Server:

Best Digger:

Best Setter:

Best Receiver:

Best Libero:

References
FIVB
 CEV Results

FIVB World Grand Prix
2005 in Japanese sport
V
2005
Sport in Sendai